Ernst Eduard Wiltheiss (12 June 1855 in Worms, Germany – 7 July 1900 in  Halle) was a German mathematician who worked on hyperelliptic functions and invariant theory.

References

19th-century German mathematicians
1855 births
1900 deaths